Ross Matthew McCorkell (born 26 May 1989), better known by the stage name Rosé, is a Scottish-American drag queen and singer based in Manhattan, New York City. He is best known for competing on the thirteenth season of RuPaul's Drag Race, placing as third/fourth runner-up alongside Gottmik.

Early life
McCorkell was born in Greenock, Scotland, in Inverclyde. As a young child, he moved with his parents, brother, and sister to Aberdeen, where he grew up. At the age of 10, the family moved to Houston, Texas, where his parents still live. McCorkell says that to fit in at school he would put on an American accent.

Career 
McCorkell, after starting drag in 2017, performed in a queer play as part of the Capital Fringe Festival, in Washington, D.C. He originally considered making “PIG.” his drag name. Then he, together with queens Jan Sport and Lagoona Bloo, formed the pop group Stephanie's Child in 2018.  In 2017, Rosé won the drag competition Lady Liberty in New York after 12 weeks of competition against 73 other drag kings and queens.

Rosé's casting on the thirteenth season of RuPaul's Drag Race was announced on 9 December 2020. Rosé performed well in the competition, winning three challenges, including the Rusical, and ultimately reaching the top four alongside Gottmik, Kandy Muse, and Symone. Rosé was one of two contestants to never be up for elimination during the season, along with Gottmik. Rosé was eliminated during the finale episode in a lip sync battle against Kandy Muse, ultimately tying with Gottmik as second/third runner up.

After the airing of the Snatch Game episode, Rosé posted a mini-series to Instagram's IGTV and YouTube titled Mary, Queen of Scots, performing as the Snatch Game character. The mini-series has featured some of Rosé's friends, including Jan and Matthew Camp.

McCorkell released his debut single as a solo artist on 7 May 2021, called "The Devil in the Details".

Filmography

Television

Web series

Music videos

Discography

EPs

As lead artist

Singles

As lead artist

As featured artist

Awards and nominations

See also
 LGBT culture in New York City

References

External links

 

1989 births
Living people
American drag queens
People from Greenock
People from New York City
RuPaul's Drag Race contestants
Scottish drag queens